Oyotún District is one of twenty districts of the province Chiclayo in Peru.

Archaeology 
In November 2019, Peruvian archaeologists led by Walter Alva discovered a 3,000-year-old, 130 feet long megalithic 'water cult' temple with 21 tombs in the Zana Valley. Archaeologists assumed that the temple was abandoned around 250 BC and later used as a burial ground by the Chumy people. Twenty of the tombs belonged to the people of Chumy, and one to an adult male buried during the Formative period with a ceramic bottle with two spouts and a bridge handle. According to the excavations, as many as three construction phases took place in the temple: the first was between 1500 BC-800 BC, when people built the foundations of the building from cone-shaped clay; second, between 800 BC-400 BC, when the megalithic temple was built under the influence of the pre-Inca civilization known as the Chavin; and finally 400 BC-100 BC, when people added circular pillars used to hold the roof of the temple.

References